El Mirador Airport,  is an airport just southeast of Puerto Varas, a city in the Los Lagos Region of Chile. Puerto Varas is on the southwest shore of Llanquihue Lake.

See also

Transport in Chile
List of airports in Chile

References

External links
El Mirador Airport at OpenStreetMap
El Mirador Airport at OurAirports

Airports in Los Lagos Region